Angelo Locci (born 21 December 1962) is an Italian male retired hurdler, which participated at the 1987 World Championships in Athletics.

Achievements

References

External links
 

1962 births
Living people
Italian male hurdlers
World Athletics Championships athletes for Italy
Mediterranean Games bronze medalists for Italy
Athletes (track and field) at the 1987 Mediterranean Games
Athletics competitors of Fiamme Azzurre
Sportspeople from Cagliari
Mediterranean Games medalists in athletics